Surendra Prasad Yadav (born 2 January 1959) is an Indian politician hailing  from eastern Indian State, Bihar. Yadav is a leader of Rashtriya Janta Dal who was consecutively elected seven times since 1990 to the Bihar Legislative Assembly. He also served as a member of 12th Lok Sabha of India from Jehanabad Parliamentary Constituency, Minister of Excise, Minister of Industry and a very close acolyte of Indian Politician Lalu Prasad Yadav.

Early life and education 
Surendra Prasad Yadav was born to a family of farmers in Gaya, Bihar. Yadav had his early education in Gaya and has attended Magadh University.

Political career 
Surendra Prasad Yadav came in contact with Lalu Prasad Yadav in 1981 when Lalu Prasad Yadav was a member of Lok Dal Party. In 1985, Surendra Prasad Yadav has been given a ticket from Lok Dal Party to contest General Election from Jehanabad parliamentary Constituency but he lost it. Later in 1990, he was given a ticket for Bihar Legislative Assembly election from Belaganj Constituency and he won.

Offices held 
 Member of Advisory Committee of Coal Ministry
 Member of Standing Committee, Industry Ministry of India
 Member of Library Committee, Bihar
 Member of Housing Committee, Bihar
 Member of Request Committee, Bihar

References

External
Bihar Legislative Assembly
Rashtriya Janta Dal
Official biographical sketch in Parliament of India website

Rashtriya Janata Dal politicians
Janata Dal politicians
India MPs 1998–1999
Lok Sabha members from Bihar
Living people
1959 births
People from Gaya district
People from Jehanabad district
Bihar MLAs 2020–2025
Magadh University alumni
Lok Dal politicians